Mickey Clark is an English financial journalist, currently working for the London Evening Standard and BBC Radio 5 Live. Clark re-joined the Evening Standard in 1999, writing for The Times and the Daily Express in the interim period.

His first role as a television presenter was on Channel 4's Business Daily from its launch in September 1987. He then presented on The Channel 4 Daily until 1991. After presenting on CNBC, Sky News and London Weekend Television, he presented three series of BBC 2's Pound for Pound.

Since its launch, Clark has co-presented Wake Up to Money on BBC Radio 5 Live, formerly with Adrian Chiles, then with Andrew Verity, and later with Adam Parsons. Clark shared the co-hosting responsibility with a range of presenters.

In February 2020, Clark's contract, and that of financial analyst Louise Cooper, with the BBC were terminated. He presented what was supposed to be his last Radio 5 show on 28 February 2020, but subsequently reappeared, from 30 November 2020.

External links
Profile, standard.co.uk. Accessed 8 December 2022.

Year of birth missing (living people)
Living people
English male journalists
British business and financial journalists
BBC Radio 5 Live presenters